Aleš Krátoška (born October 6, 1974) is a Czech former professional ice hockey centre.

Krátoška played a total of the 384 games in the Czech Extraliga, playing for HC Vítkovice, HC Plzeň, HC Slavia Praha, HC Karlovy Vary and Motor České Budějovice. He also played in the SM-liiga for Ässät and Pelicans and the GET-ligaen for the Trondheim Black Panthers.

References

External links

1974 births
Living people
Ässät players
Motor České Budějovice players
Czech ice hockey coaches
Czech ice hockey centres
HC Karlovy Vary players
Lahti Pelicans players
EV Landshut players
BK Mladá Boleslav players
People from Pacov
IHC Písek players
HC Plzeň players
HC Slavia Praha players
HC Tábor players
Trondheim Black Panthers players
HC Vítkovice players
Sportspeople from the Vysočina Region
Czech expatriate ice hockey players in Germany
Czech expatriate ice hockey players in Finland
Czechoslovak ice hockey centres
Czech expatriate sportspeople in Norway
Expatriate ice hockey players in Norway